Denis Yongule Daluri (born 3 June 1998) is a South Sudanese professional footballer who most recently played as a midfielder for Maltese Challenge League club Lija Athletic and the South Sudan national team.

Club career
Daluri previously played for Geelong SC, Brisbane Strikers and Green Gully.

On 20 January 2022, Maltese second-tier club Lija Athletic announced Daluri's signing.

International career
Daluri made his debut for South Sudan on September 4, 2019, in a 2022 FIFA World Cup qualifier against Equatorial Guinea.

International statistics

Personal life
In addition to being a South Sudanese national, Yongule is a naturalised citizen of Australia due to his family's permanent relocation there.

References

External links

Daluri, Denis
Daluri, Denis
Daluri, Denis
Daluri, Denis
Daluri, Denis
Daluri, Denis
Daluri, Denis
Daluri, Denis
Daluri, Denis
Daluri, Denis